George Swift may refer to:
George Bell Swift (1845–1912), mayor of Chicago, Illinois
George Swift (footballer) (1870–1956), English footballer
George Herbert Swift Jr (1926–2014), American mathematician and computer scientist
George R. Swift (1887–1972), U.S. senator Alabama